The M-71 is a 155 mm 39 caliber towed howitzer manufactured by Israeli company Soltam Systems.

Design
The weapon was based on the earlier Soltam M-68 and uses the same recoil system, breech and carriage but had a longer gun barrel (39 calibre versus 33 calibre of M-68). It is fitted with a compressed air-driven rammer to permit rapid and easy loading at all angles of elevation as well as having a rechargeable battery mounted on the right trail for auxiliary power.

Deployment
In addition to Israel, this weapon is in service with Chile, Singapore, Thailand, Philippines, South Africa, Slovenia and Myanmar. A version of this weapon was developed to mount on a modified Centurion chassis (M-72), but this vehicle never reached production.

Operators

: 8
: 60 howitzers used by the Chilean Army, 36 Soltam M-68s acquired in the 1970s later upgraded to Soltam M-71 standard and 24 Soltam M-71 howitzers acquired in the 1980s. 24 designated G-4 howitzers acquired by the Chilean Marine Corps in South Africa in 1992. 

: 72
:
 Philippine Army: 20
 Philippine Marine Corps: 6 
: 13 or 38 - modified to the M-71S standard using less crew + addition of APU.
: 18; M839 variant.
: 32; designated G-4.
: 32

See also
155 K 83
FH-88
Soltam M-68
ATMOS 2000
M777 howitzer

References

External links

Chilean Army Profile
Singapore Artillery Pieces
Weapons of the Arab-Israeli Wars

155 mm artillery
Artillery of Israel
Military equipment introduced in the 1970s